Hunting Aircraft was a British aircraft manufacturer that produced light training aircraft and the initial design that would evolve into the BAC 1-11 jet airliner. Founded as Percival Aircraft Co. in 1933, the company later moved to Luton, UK. It was eventually taken over by the British Aircraft Corporation (BAC) in 1960.

History
 
The company was formed as Percival Aircraft Co. in Gravesend in 1933 by Edgar Percival to produce his own designs. Restructured in 1936, it became Percival Aircraft Ltd, and moved to Luton Airport.

The company became part of the Hunting Group in 1944. Percival, who had resigned from the board to serve in the Royal Air Force Volunteer Reserve during the war sold his remaining interest in the company at that point.

From 1947 some internal components of Britain's Blue Danube atomic bomb were designed and manufactured by Percival Aircraft, in collaboration with the High Explosive Research project at Fort Halstead, Kent.

It changed its name to Hunting Percival Aircraft in 1954 and then to Hunting Aircraft in 1957.

In 1960 the company was taken over by the British Aircraft Corporation (BAC), itself formed earlier that same year through the merger of the Bristol Aeroplane Company, English Electric and Vickers-Armstrongs. BAC later became part of British Aerospace, now BAE Systems.

Aircraft 
Percival Aircraft

The first Percival type to be allocated a "P" number was the P.40 Prentice. Previous designs (including unflown designs) were unofficially allocated such a number by the Percival Sales Manager in 1944 when Percival was acquired by the Hunting Group. However, this was "purely a cosmetic exercise" and such numbers have no actual basis in history.

Percival Gull
Percival Vega Gull
Percival Mew Gull
Percival Q.6 Petrel
Percival Proctor
Percival P.40 Prentice
Percival P.48 Merganser
Percival P.50 Prince
Percival P.54 Survey Prince
Percival P.56 Provost
Percival P.66 Pembroke
Percival P.66 President
Percival P.74 8-seat experimental gas turbine/tipjet powered helicopter
P.87 fixed wing DC-3 replacement, not built
Hunting Aircraft
Hunting H.126 – an experimental STOL jet aircraft
Hunting Percival P.84 Jet Provost
Hunting H.107 – an airliner project started by Hunting, and evolved after the BAC take-over as the BAC 1-11)

See also
 Aerospace industry in the United Kingdom
 List of aircraft manufacturers

References

Defunct aircraft manufacturers of the United Kingdom
Defunct helicopter manufacturers of the United Kingdom
Former defence companies of the United Kingdom
Companies based in Luton
Vehicle manufacturing companies established in 1933
Vehicle manufacturing companies disestablished in 1960
1933 establishments in England
1960 disestablishments in England